Lundby is a village on the island of Tåsinge in south-central Denmark, in  Svendborg Municipality.

Notes 

Cities and towns in the Region of Southern Denmark
Svendborg Municipality